Walther Dahl (27 March 1916 – 25 November 1985) was a German pilot and a fighter ace during World War II. He was a recipient of the Knight's Cross of the Iron Cross with Oak Leaves of Nazi Germany. Dahl claimed some 128 enemy aircraft shot down in 678 missions.

Early life and career
Dahl was born on 27 March 1916 in Lug near Bad Bergzabern, son of a Volksschule teacher who was killed in action in 1918 on the Western Front of World War I. He joined the military service on 29 October 1935, initially serving as a Schütze with Infanterie-Regiment 35 before transferring to Infanterie-Regiment 119 in Stuttgart on 6 October 1936. On 18 January 1938, Dahl was promoted to Leutnant (second lieutenant) of the Reserves with an effective date as of 1 January 1938.

On 28 October 1938, Dahl quit his service with the Heer (army) and joined the Schutzpolizei (police) on 29 October 1938. On 1 May 1939, Dahl resigned and joined the Luftwaffe (air force) and becoming a fighter pilot.

World War II

In May 1941 Dahl was posted to Jagdgeschwader 3 (JG 3—3rd Fighter Wing) and claimed his first victory on 22 June during the first day of the invasion of the Soviet Union.

Dahl commanded 4. Staffel of JG 3 from 13 February until 9 April 1942 as Staffelkapitän. He had taken over command from Hauptmann Georg Michalek who was transferred. When Dahl was ordered to take over command of 1. Staffel of Ergänzungsgruppe Süd, he passed command of 4. Staffel of JG 3 to Oberleutnant Gerhard Walz. On 20 July 1943, Dahl was given command as Gruppenkommandeur (group commander) of III. Gruppe of JG 3. He replaced Hauptmann Karl-Heinz Langer who was one of the temporary leaders of the Gruppe after its former commander Hauptmann Wolfgang Ewald became a prisoner of war on 14 July.

Wing commander

On 21 May 1944, Dahl was appointed commander of Jagdgeschwader zur besonderen Verwendung (JG z.b.V.—a special purpose fighter wing). He led the unit until taking command of Jagdgeschwader 300 (JG 300—300th Fighter Wing) on 27 June 1944. Dahl set up his Geschwaderstab (headquarters unit) at Ansbach, planning combined operations with JG 3 "Udet". Dahl succeeded Major Walter Brede as commander of JG 300. Command of III. Gruppe of JG 3 was then passed to Major Karl-Heinz Langer.

On 7 July 1944, a force of 1,129 B-17 Flying Fortresses and B-24 Liberators of the United States Army Air Forces (USAAF) Eighth Air Force set out from England to bomb aircraft factories in the Leipzig area and the synthetic oil plants at Boehlen, Leuna-Merseburg and Lützkendorf. This force was divided into three prongs. The first group consisted of 373 B-24s, the second force of the 3rd Bomb Division was made up of 303 B-17s, and the third wave was made up of 450 B-17s. A series of accidents at the start of the mission allowed the Luftwaffe to focus their attacks on the B-24 force. This formation was intercepted by a German Gefechtsverband (task force) consisting of IV.(Sturm) Gruppe Jagdgeschwader 3 escorted by two Gruppen of Bf 109s from JG 300 led by Dahl. Dahl drove the attack to point-blank range behind the Liberators of the 492nd Bomb Group before opening fire. 492nd Bomb Group was temporarily without fighter cover. Within about a minute the entire squadron of twelve B-24s had been annihilated. The Germans claimed 28 USAAF 2nd Air Division B-24s that day and were credited with at least 21. The majority to the Sturmgruppe attack, IV./JG 3 lost nine fighters shot down and three more suffered damage and made crash landings; five of the unit's pilots were killed. On this mission, Dahl was credited with his 72nd aerial victory, a B-24 shot down in the vicinity of Quedlinburg.

On 13 September, Dahl claimed to have brought down a B-17 four-engined bomber by ramming according to his own account. Lorant and Goyat, the historians of JG 300, found no evidence of a corresponding loss in US archives.

On 26 January 1945, Hermann Göring appointed him Inspekteur der Tagjäger (Inspector of the Day Fighters). Despite his promotion, Dahl continued to fly operationally. On 28 February 1945, Dahl was credited with his 100th aerial victory. He was the 98th Luftwaffe pilot to achieve the century mark.

Dahl ended the war flying the Messerschmitt Me 262 jet fighter with III./Ergänzungs-Jagdgeschwader 2 (a supplementary fighter unit). On 27 March 1945, Dahl claimed two P-47 Thunderbolt fighter kills. His 129th and last victory was a USAAF P-51 Mustang near Dillingen an der Donau on 26 April 1945. Dahl was promoted to Oberst (colonel) on 30 April 1945. He was taken prisoner of war by US forces in Bavaria at the end of World War II in Europe.

Later life
Following the war, Dahl became a member of the Deutsche Reichspartei (DRP—German Reich Party) In the West German federal election of 1961 he unsuccessfully ran as a candidate for the DRP. On 8 May 1961, Dahl founded the "Reichsverband der Soldaten" (RdS—lit. "Reich Association of Soldiers"). Among others, the founding meeting was attended by Adolf von Thadden and Erich Kern, the honorary president was Hans-Ulrich Rudel. It was planned that the RdS youth program was to be organized in the Bund Vaterländischer Jugend (Coalition of the Patriotic Youth), a group which was banned that same year due to its radical right-wing affiliation.

Dahl was married to Regina Dahl, a journalist with the National Zeitung, a weekly extreme right newspaper published by Gerhard Frey. Dahl was a spokesman for the German People's Union, a nationalist political party founded by Frey. In 2004, Frey and Hajo Herrmann published an abstract of Dahl's biography in the book Helden der Wehrmacht – Unsterbliche deutsche Soldaten [Heroes of the Wehrmacht – Immortal German soldiers]. This publication was classified as a far-right wing publication by Claudia Fröhlich and Horst-Alfred Heinrich. Dahl died on 25 November 1985 of heart failure in Heidelberg.

Publications
 Rammjäger: Bericht über seine Kriegserlebnisse 1943 bis 1945 (in German).   (2000).

Summary of career

Aerial victory claims
According to US historian David T. Zabecki, Dahl was credited with 129 aerial victories. Spick lists him with 128 aerial victories claimed in 678 combat missions. This figure includes 77 claims on the Eastern Front, and 51 on the Western Front, 36 of them being four-engined bombers. Mathews and Foreman, authors of Luftwaffe Aces — Biographies and Victory Claims, researched the German Federal Archives and state that he claimed at least 90 aerial victories, at least 56 of which claimed on the Eastern Front and more than 34 on Western Front, including over 22 four-engined bombers, plus further 13 unconfirmed claims. He claimed seven victories flying the Me 262. The claim that he is attributed with 128 aerial victories cannot be verified through the archives.

Victory claims were logged to a map-reference (PQ = Planquadrat), for example "PQ 49283". These sectors were then subdivided into 36 smaller units to give a location area 3 × 4 km in size.

Awards
 Honor Goblet of the Luftwaffe on 5 January 1942
 German Cross in Gold on 2 December 1942 as Oberleutnant in the Stab/JG 3
 Knight's Cross of the Iron Cross with Oak Leaves
 Knight's Cross on 11 March 1944 as Major and Gruppenkommandeur of the III./Jagdgeschwader 3 "Udet"
 724th Oak Leaves on 1 February 1945 as Major and Geschwaderkommodore of Jagdgeschwader 300

Notes

References

Citations

Bibliography

External links

1916 births
1985 deaths
People from Südwestpfalz
German World War II flying aces
Luftwaffe pilots
Recipients of the Gold German Cross
Recipients of the Knight's Cross of the Iron Cross with Oak Leaves
German prisoners of war in World War II held by the United States
Deutsche Reichspartei politicians
Military personnel from Rhineland-Palatinate
Pilots who performed an aerial ramming